In mathematics, in particular in algebraic topology, the Hopf invariant is a homotopy invariant of certain maps between n-spheres.


Motivation 
In 1931 Heinz Hopf used Clifford parallels to construct the Hopf map 
, 

and proved that  is essential, i.e., not homotopic to the constant map, by using the fact that the linking number of the circles 

is equal to 1, for any .

In 1951, Jean-Pierre Serre proved that the  rational homotopy groups 
 

for an odd-dimensional sphere ( odd) are zero unless   is equal to 0 or n. However, for an even-dimensional sphere (n even), there is one more bit of infinite cyclic homotopy in degree .

Definition 
Let  be a continuous map (assume ). Then we can form the cell complex

 

where  is a -dimensional disc attached to  via .
Cellular (co-)homology is the (co-)homology of this chain complex, and since all boundary homomorphisms must be zero (recall that ), the cohomology is

 

Denote the generators of the cohomology groups by

  and 

Thus, as a ring, the cohomology is

 

The integer  is the Hopf invariant of the map .

Properties 
Theorem: The map  is a homomorphism. 
If  is odd,  is trivial (since  is torsion).
If  is even, the image of  contains . Moreover, the image of the Whitehead product of identity maps equals 2, i. e.

It is a theorem, proved first by Frank Adams, and subsequently by Adams and Michael Atiyah with methods of topological K-theory, that these are the only maps with Hopf invariant 1.

Whitehead integral formula 

J. H. C. Whitehead has proposed the following integral formula for the Hopf invariant.
Given a map , one considers a volume form  on  such that .
Since , the pullback  is a Closed differential form: .
By Poincaré's lemma it is an exact differential form: there exists an -form  on  such that . The Hopf invariant is then given by

Generalisations for stable maps 

A very general notion of the Hopf invariant can be defined, but it requires a certain amount of homotopy theoretic groundwork:

Let  denote a vector space and  its one-point compactification, i.e.  and 

.

Now let 
 

be a stable map, i.e. stable under the reduced suspension functor.
,

If we let 
 

denote the canonical diagonal map and  the identity, then the Hopf invariant is defined by the following:

This map is initially a map from 

but under the direct limit it becomes the advertised element of the stable homotopy -equivariant group of maps.
There exists also an unstable version of the Hopf invariant , for which one must keep track of the vector space .

References

 
 
 
 

Homotopy theory